The Südwestdeutsche Verkehrs-Aktiengesellschaft (SWEG), in English language Southwest German Transport Company, from its former name, Südwestdeutsche Eisenbahn-Gesellschaft (SEG), is a transport company in southwest Germany that operates railway lines and bus services. It is 100% owned by the federal state of Baden-Württemberg.

On 24 July 2017, a merger between SWEG and the Hohenzollerische Landesbahn (HzL) was approved by the Sigmaringen and Zollernalbkreis district authorities which each hold 14% stakes in HzL. The merger has already been approved by the state of Baden-Württemberg, which besides its ownership of SWEG also owns 72% of HzL. The merger is intended to take effect from the beginning of 2018.

Railway services 
SWEG directly owns and operates the following railway lines:

 Achern – Ottenhöfen (the Achertalbahn)
 Bad Krozingen – Münstertal (the Münstertalbahn)
 Biberach (Baden) – Oberharmersbach-Riersbach (the Harmersbachtalbahn)
 Bühl – Schwarzach – Stollhofen (goods only)
 Gottenheim – Riegel am Kaiserstuhl – Breisach (the Kaiserstuhlbahn)

SWEG's wholly owned Ortenau S-Bahn subsidiary also operates services over lines owned by DB Netz AG in the vicinity of Offenburg. SWEG also has a 50% share-holding in the Breisgau S-Bahn, which operates similar services in the vicinity of Freiburg im Breisgau.

References

External links 
 
 Official website of the SWEG

Railway companies of Germany
Ortenaukreis
Public bus companies of Germany